is a railway station on the Joetsu Line in the city of Nagaoka, Niigata, Japan, operated by East Japan Railway Company (JR East).

Lines
Echigo-Kawaguchi Station is served by the  Joetsu Line and Iiyama Line.

Station layout
The station consists of one ground-level side platform and one island platform serving three tracks. The platforms are connected by an underground passageway. The station has a Midori no Madoguchi staffed ticket office.

Platforms

History

The station opened on 5 August 1921. With the privatization of Japanese National Railways (JNR) on 1 April 1987, the station came under the control of JR East.

The station building sustained some damage in the 2004 Chuetsu Earthquake, which hit on 23 October 2004.

Passenger statistics
In fiscal 2017, the station was used by an average of 197 passengers daily (boarding passengers only).

Surrounding area
 Former Kawaguchi Town Hall

See also
 List of railway stations in Japan

References

External links

  

Railway stations in Nagaoka, Niigata
Railway stations in Japan opened in 1921
Stations of East Japan Railway Company
Iiyama Line
Jōetsu Line